Mario Alberto Avilés (born September 16, 1969) is a Mexican prelate of the Roman Catholic Church who has been serving as auxiliary bishop for the Diocese of Brownsville in Texas since 2017.

Biography
Mario Avilés was born on September 16, 1969, in Mexico City, Mexico.  He professed his vows to the Oratory of Saint Philip Neri in 1986.

On July 21, 1998, Avilés was ordained to the priesthood by Bishop José Raúl Vera López for the Oratory. In 2012, he was appointed as procurator general of the Oratory. 

Pope Francis appointed Avilés as auxiliary bishop for the Diocese of Brownsville on December 4, 2017.  On February 22, 2018, Avilés was consecrated by Bishop Daniel E. Flores.

See also

 Catholic Church hierarchy
 Catholic Church in the United States
 Historical list of the Catholic bishops of the United States
 List of Catholic bishops of the United States
 Lists of patriarchs, archbishops, and bishops

References

External links
Roman Catholic Diocese of Brownsville Official Site

Episcopal succession

 

1969 births
Living people
People from Mexico City
Mexican expatriates in the United States
Mexican Roman Catholic priests
21st-century Roman Catholic bishops in the United States
Bishops appointed by Pope Francis